The 2011 Dallas Cup was the 32nd since its establishment. 16 teams participated in the tournament. The competition was sponsored by Dr Pepper.

Participating teams

From AFC:

  

From CONCACAF:

  Vancouver Whitecaps
  L.D. Alajuelense
  C.S. Cartaginés
  Tigres de la UANL
  Chorrillo F.C.
  FC Dallas
  Dallas Texans
  Houston Dynamo
  Real Salt Lake

From CONMEBOL:

  Corinthians Paulista
  Coritiba FC
  Bolívar

From UEFA:

  Arsenal Academy
  FC Barcelona
  Eintracht Frankfurt

Standings

Group A

Group B

Group C

Group D

Semifinal

Championship
Due to inclement weather, the game was called off in the 65th minute and the two teams declared co-champions.

Top Scorer

External links 
 2011 Dr Pepper Dallas Cup XXXII

References 

2011
Dallas Cup, 2011